Shazia Mubashar is a Pakistani politician who had been a member of the National Assembly of Pakistan, from September 2013 to May 2018.

Political career

She was elected to the National Assembly of Pakistan as a candidate of Pakistan Muslim League (N) from Constituency NA-129 (Lahore-XII) in by-election held in August 2013. She received 44,894 votes and defeated Muhammad Mansha Sindhu, a candidate of Pakistan Tehreek-e-Insaf (PTI). The seat became vacant after Shahbaz Sharif who won it in 2013 Pakistani general election vacated it in order to retain the seat won in his home Provincial Assembly constituency.

References

Living people
Pakistan Muslim League (N) politicians
Punjabi people
Pakistani MNAs 2013–2018
Year of birth missing (living people)
Women members of the National Assembly of Pakistan
21st-century Pakistani women politicians